Joseph Garibaldi (12 May 1863, Marseille - 6 May 1941, Marseille) was a French painter, specializing in cityscapes and coastal scenes.

Biography 
His father, an employee of the Noilly Prat distillery, was originally from Italy. A visit from the famous artist, Antoine Vollon, was decisive. Under his influence and advice, Garibaldi held his first exhibit at the Salon. They also became close friends, and he would be a trusted assistant during Vollon's final illness.

He would exhibit regularly at the Salon from 1884 to 1914; receiving a second-class medal in 1897. He specialized in scenes of coastal ports, including Cassis, which he visited from 1884 to 1899, and La Ciotat, but his favorite would always remain the Old Port of Marseille.

Until 1905, he benefitted greatly from the patronage of Baron Alphonse de Rothschild, who bought his paintings and donated them to provincial museums. For the remainder of his career, he received significant support from his friends Étienne Martin, José Silbert and Édouard Crémieux who were, successively, the Directors of the Association des Artistes Marseillais.
  
Apart from brief trips to Venice and Corsica, he was content to remain in his home district. After World War I, he took advantage of accommodations that had been provided for him in Fos-sur-Mer. During the 1930s, he gradually developed glaucoma and was forced to stop painting.

Selected paintings

References

Further reading 
 Denis Coutagne, Bruno Ely, Jean-Roger Soubiran, Peintres de la couleur en Provence: 1875-1920, Office Régional de la Culture Provence-Alpes-côte d'Azur, 1995 .

External links 

More works by Garibaldi @ ArtNet

1863 births
1941 deaths
19th-century French painters
French landscape painters
French marine artists
Artists from Marseille
20th-century French painters